Hypostomus pseudohemiurus is a species of catfish in the family Loricariidae. It is native to South America, where it occurs in the Courantyne River basin in Suriname. The species reaches 6.2 cm (2.4 inches) in standard length and is believed to be a facultative air-breather.

References 

Catfish of South America
pseudohemiurus
Fish described in 1968